Murali is a village (selo) in Arsky District of the Republic of Tatarstan, Russia, located on the bank of the Kismes River,  south-east of Arsk, the administrative center of the district.  Population: 305 (2000 est.); 315 (1989); all ethnic Tatars. There is a primary school and a club in the village. The main occupation of the population is agriculture and cattle breeding. The village has been known to exist since the times of the Khanate of Kazan.

References

Rural localities in Tatarstan
Mamadyshsky Uyezd